Unicum is a Hungarian herbal liqueur or bitters, drunk as a digestif and apéritif. The liqueur was created in 1790 and is today produced by Zwack according to a secret formula of more than forty herbs; the drink is aged in oak casks. During communism in Hungary, the Zwack family lived in exile in New York City and Chicago, and Unicum in Hungary was produced using a different formula. Before moving to the United States, János Zwack had entrusted a family friend in Milan with the production of Unicum based on the original recipe. After the fall of communism, Péter Zwack returned to Hungary and resumed production of the original Unicum.

The texture of the drink is "thick, black, goopy" and so bitter that it is often described as an acquired taste.  The drink's name originates from the words of Holy Roman Emperor Joseph II, who in 1790, when being given the drink, said (in German) "Das ist ein Unikum!" ("This is unique!").

Unicum is regarded as one of the national drinks of Hungary. The production facility offers tours which include a tasting session of the multiple different varieties including Unicum and Unicum Plum. According to the manufacturer, the original Unicum is no longer distributed in the United States, having been replaced by Unicum Next (a sweeter, thinner-bodied drink with a more prominent citrus flavour), re-branded as "Zwack".

See also 
Zwack liqueur made from the same recipe (but not bitters)
National symbols of Hungary
Kräuterlikör

References

External links

Hungarian alcoholic drinks
Hungarian liqueurs
Bitters
Herbal liqueurs
Hungarian brands